Jeri Sitzes (born 21 March 1979) is an American boxer, kickboxer and Muay Thai fighter. She is a former WBC Muaythai Super Bantamweight champion and the former NABF Featherweight champion.
She started her professional combat career as a boxer with 15 wins, 10 defeats and 1 draw.

Personal life
She is a lesbian.

Championships and accomplishments

Boxing
North American Boxing Federation
NABF Featherweight Championship

Muay Thai
World Boxing Council
WBC Muaythai Super Bantamweight Championship 
Awakening Fighters
2017 Awakening Fighters Fight of the Year

Professional boxing record

References

1979 births
American Muay Thai practitioners
Living people
Bantamweight boxers
Female Muay Thai practitioners
American female kickboxers
American women boxers
Flyweight mixed martial artists
Mixed martial artists utilizing boxing
Mixed martial artists utilizing Muay Thai
People from Springfield, Missouri
LGBT people from Missouri
American LGBT sportspeople
Bantamweight kickboxers
Lesbian sportswomen
LGBT boxers
LGBT mixed martial artists
LGBT kickboxers
LGBT Muay Thai practitioners
21st-century American women